Michel Broué (born 28 October 1946) is a French mathematician. He holds a chair at Paris Diderot University. Broué has made contributions to algebraic geometry and representation theory.

In 2012 he became a fellow of the American Mathematical Society.

He is the son of French historian Pierre Broué and the father of French director and screenwriter Isabelle Broué and of French journalist and radio producer Caroline Broué.

References

External links
Website at Paris Diderot University

1946 births
Living people
20th-century French mathematicians
21st-century French mathematicians
University of Paris alumni
Fellows of the American Mathematical Society